Florentino Pérez Rodríguez (born 8 March 1947) is a Spanish businessman, civil engineer, former politician, and the current president of football club Real Madrid, as well as Chairman and CEO of Grupo ACS, a civil engineering company. He was also the first and only chairman of the breakaway football league called European Super League, a proposed project that was founded through a limited-liability company in Spain which had to stop operations in April 2021 due to legal issues with UEFA.

Early career
Pérez attended the Polytechnic University of Madrid. Pérez joined the Union of the Democratic Centre party in 1979, serving among others on Madrid's city council. In 1986, Pérez ran in the Spanish general elections as candidate for the Democratic Reformist Party (Partido Reformista Democrático) and served as its secretary-general.

In 1993, Pérez was named vice president of OCP Construcciones. After the fusion of OCP with Gines y Navarro into Actividades de Construcción y Servicios, S.A. (ACS) in 1997, he became president of the new company. As of 2018, Pérez leads Grupo ACS, Spain's largest construction company, and has a net worth of $2.3 billion.

Real Madrid presidency

First term
Pérez's second attempt was more successful, as he took over as president of Real Madrid in 2000, beating the current president at that time, Lorenzo Sanz. Sanz assumed that the recently won UEFA Champions Leagues in 1998 and 2000 would give him enough credit to win the elections, but Pérez's campaign, once again highlighting the financial problems of the club and claims of mismanagement by the previous boards, proved otherwise. Pérez's promise to bring in Luís Figo from arch-rivals Barcelona also played a decisive role in the elections. Pérez was reelected in 2004 with 94.2% of the total votes.

Figo also marked the start of Pérez's policy to bring one of the best football players in the world to Real Madrid each season. The strategy was initially known as that of Zidanes y Pavones in which superstars would play alongside the Canteranos, but the players were soon popularly referred to as Galácticos. In 2001, Zinedine Zidane was signed from Juventus for a then-world record transfer fee of €77.5 million. He was followed by Ronaldo in 2002, David Beckham in 2003, Michael Owen in 2004, and Robinho for a short time in 2005. Initially, Pérez's policy worked to great success, as each new Galáctico had the squad built around them, and the team had a good balance between attack and defence. In his first years in office, Real Madrid won two Spanish championships and its record ninth UEFA Champions League. Pérez claimed success in clearing the club's debt; however, this was contradicted by director Ramón Calderón.

Several years after leaving Real, Fernando Hierro stated that Claude Makélélé had been the club's most important and least appreciated midfielder, saying: "The loss of Makélélé was the beginning of the end for Los Galácticos... You can see that it was also the beginning of a new dawn for Chelsea." From the 2003–04 season onward, with the absence of manager Vicente del Bosque and Makelele, Real Madrid failed to win a trophy.

Although Pérez's policy resulted in increased financial success based on the exploitation of the club's high marketing potential around the world, especially in Asia, it came under increasing criticism for being focused too much on marketing the Real Madrid brand and not enough on the football. He announced his resignation on 27 February 2006, acknowledging that the team and the club as a whole needed a new direction.

Second term
On 14 May 2009, Pérez announced his candidacy for president of Real Madrid in a press conference at the Hotel Ritz Madrid. On 1 June, given that he was the only candidate able to provide the €57,389,000 guarantee necessary to run for the presidency, Pérez was announced as the new president of Real Madrid.

In his second term, Pérez continued with the Galácticos policy pursued during his first term. On 8 June, he bought Kaká from Milan for just under £60 million, while on 11 June, Manchester United accepted an £80 million offer for Cristiano Ronaldo, which would once again break the world record. On 25 June, Pérez and Real Madrid announced the signing of Valencia centre-back Raúl Albiol for €15 million. On 1 July, Pérez bought Karim Benzema from Olympique Lyonnais for a fee of at least £30 million, which could rise to £35 million, depending on the player's success. On 5 August, Real Madrid confirmed the signing of Xabi Alonso from Liverpool for £30 million; Alonso became the second Liverpool player to join Real Madrid in the same transfer window after full-back Álvaro Arbeloa's £5 million switch to the Santiago Bernabéu in July. On 31 May 2010, Pérez presented José Mourinho as the new manager of Real Madrid in a £6.8 million deal.

During the next three years, Pérez brought a lot of new faces to the team, including the German wonderkid Mesut Özil, and Ángel Di María, who both attracted attention from Europe's elite football clubs during the 2010 World Cup in South Africa. The squad managed to break Barcelona's dominance, winning the Copa del Rey in 2011 and then clinching La Liga title in 2012 with record-breaking 100 points. Additionally, in 2011 Madrid reached the semi-final stage of the Champions League for the first time since 2003. In his third season, Mourinho led the team to its third consecutive Champions League semi-finals, second place in the league and advanced to the Copa del Rey final, where Real lost to Atlético after extra time. However, lacking a major trophy encouraged Mourinho to depart for his former club Chelsea.

On 2 June 2013, Pérez was awarded a fourth term as the Real Madrid president, bringing in Carlo Ancelotti to replace Mourinho. Mesut Özil and Gonzalo Higuaín were sold to Arsenal and Napoli, respectively, at the start of the season to secure spots for Luka Modrić and Karim Benzema in the first team. Pérez also brought in Welsh footballer and PFA Player of the Year Gareth Bale, purchased from Tottenham Hotspur for a fee reported to be in the £86 million range, yet again breaking the world record. Two promising Spanish talents, playmaker Isco and holding midfielder Asier Illarramendi, were also secured by Pérez prior to the start of the season. The following season proved to be a resounding success, as Real Madrid won the Copa del Rey and its tenth Champions League title.

During the 2014 summer transfer window, Pérez brought in 2014 FIFA World Cup stars James Rodríguez, Toni Kroos, and Keylor Navas to Real Madrid for a combined cost of £95 million, as well as Javier Hernández on a loan deal from Manchester United. As a result of the mounting competition for starting spots and wage disputes, Di María left the club for Manchester United for a British record transfer fee of £60 million. Xabi Alonso also left during this transfer window to join Bayern Munich. In January 2015, Pérez demonstrated his success in the transfer market when Real Madrid signed the 16-year-old Norwegian Martin Ødegaard in competition with many of the big clubs in Europe, including Bayern, Barcelona and Arsenal.

Later on, Real Madrid, coached by former player Frenchman Zinedine Zidane, proceeded to win three consecutive Champions League titles in 2015–16, 2016–17 and 2017–18, a feat not achieved since Bayern Munich had won their third consecutive title in 1975–76. In 2019, he revealed the plans to renovate the Santiago Bernabéu Stadium.

In the 2019–20 season, Real Madrid won their 34th La Liga title which was their fifth under Pérez and second under coach Zidane. In the 2021–22 season, Real Madrid won their sixth La Liga and sixth Champions League title under Pérez, meaning he managed to equal the record of Santiago Bernabéu for the latter.

European Super League
In April 2021, Pérez was named the first chairman of the Super League, a breakaway league involving some of Europe's largest football clubs. According to The New York Times, Pérez "had been the driving force behind much of it; it was, to some extent, his brainchild." Spearheaded by Pérez and Andrea Agnelli of Juventus, the Super League was in the works for three years; however, the final phases were rushed, and allegiance among the twelve clubs, instead of the fifteen as originally planned, seemed to have been forged under pressure. The announcement was unexpectedly poorly planned, devoid of real content, and the coalition, liable to break under pressure, came apart quickly. Pérez expressed hope that the new competition would "provide higher-quality matches and additional financial resources for the overall football pyramid", provide "significantly greater economic growth and support for European football via a long-term commitment to uncapped solidarity payments which will grow in line with league revenues", appeal to a new younger generation of football fans, and improve VAR and refereeing.

The 18 April announcement of the European Super League (ESL) received almost universal opposition from fans, players, managers, politicians, and other clubs as well as UEFA, FIFA, and national governments. Much of the criticism against the ESL was due to concerns about elitism and the lack of competitiveness within the competition, as it would have consisted of only high-ranking teams from a few European countries. Backlash against the announcement of the league's formation led to nine of the clubs involved, including all six of the English clubs, announcing their intention to withdraw. The remaining members of the ESL subsequently announced they would "reconsider the most appropriate steps to reshape the project" following the departure of the other clubs. Three days after its founding, the ESL announced that it was suspending its operations.

Commentators argued that the ESL could render domestic competitions as irrelevant and lower tier compared to the Super League, and it would destroy the ideas behind promotion and relegation systems; Pérez later countered this with claims that the ESL would have a system of promotion and relegation. Pérez alleged that Bayern Munich, Borussia Dortmund, and Paris Saint-Germain, which were reportedly sought out by the ESL and gave them between 14 and 30 days to join but who rejected involvement in the competition and publicly condemned the concept, had not been invited. Pérez cited the European basketball EuroLeague as an inspiration and stated that the EuroLeague saved European basketball, and the Super League would do the same for football.

After the backlash and withdrawals, Pérez stated that none of the founding clubs had officially left the association, as they were tied to binding contracts, and vowed to work with the governing bodies to make some form of the Super League work. Whilst blaming the English clubs of losing their nerve in face of opposition and the footballing authorities for acting unjustifiably aggressively, Pérez insisted that the Super League project was merely on standby and not over. In response to UEFA's sanctions and possible Real Madrid's exclusion from UEFA competitions, among the other clubs involved, Pérez said that this would be "impossible" and that the law protects them.

On 31 May, the Super League filed a complaint to the Court of Justice of the European Union (CJEU) against UEFA and FIFA for their proposals to stop the organization of the competition. On June 7, the Swiss Federal Department of Justice and Police notified the Spanish precautionary measure, which had earlier issued an injunction against UEFA and FIFA, and referred a cuestión preliminar (English: preliminary question) to the CJEU on whether UEFA and FIFA have violated articles 101 and 102 of the TFEU, to both governing bodies, ruling them to not execute sanctions against clubs still active in the project, including Real Madrid. On 15 June, it was officially confirmed Real Madrid, Barcelona, and Juventus were admitted to the 2021–22 UEFA Champions League.

In July 2021, El Confidencial published audios of Pérez recorded by José Antonio Abellán from 2006 and 2012, in which he insulted many Real Madrid players such as Raúl, Iker Casillas, Luís Figo, Guti, Cristiano Ronaldo, Mesut Özil and others. However, Real Madrid had issued a statement claiming that the leaks came at a time when Pérez was involved in promoting the Super League.

Personal life
Pérez married María de los Ángeles Sandoval Montero in 1970, with whom he had Eduardo, Florentino and María Ángeles. His wife died on 23 May 2012, aged 62, due to a heart attack.

During the COVID-19 pandemic in Spain, Pérez tested positive on 2 February 2021, but had no symptoms.

Honours
 La Liga:
 Winners: 2000–01, 2002–03, 2011–12, 2016–17, 2019–20, 2021–22
 Runners-up: 2004–05, 2005–06, 2009–10, 2010–11, 2012–13, 2014–15, 2015–16, 2020–21
 Copa del Rey:
 Winners: 2010–11, 2013–14
 Runners-up: 2001–02, 2003–04, 2012–13
 Supercopa de España:
 Winners: 2001, 2003, 2012, 2017, 2019–20, 2021–22
 Runners-up: 2011, 2014, 2022-23
 UEFA Champions League:
 Winners: 2001–02, 2013–14, 2015–16, 2016–17, 2017–18, 2021–22
 UEFA Super Cup:
 Winners: 2002, 2014, 2016, 2017, 2022
 Runners-up : 2000, 2018
 Intercontinental Cup:
 Winners: 2002
 Runners-up: 2000
 FIFA Club World Cup:
 Winners: 2014, 2016, 2017, 2018, 2022

Awards
  Grand Cross of the Order of the Second of May (2011)
 Golden Foot Prestige: 2022

References

External links

 
 Profile at Realmadrid.com

1947 births
Living people
Businesspeople from Madrid
Spanish billionaires
Polytechnic University of Madrid alumni
Madrid city councillors (1979–1983)
Union of the Democratic Centre (Spain) politicians
Real Madrid CF presidents
Spanish civil engineers
20th-century Spanish businesspeople
21st-century Spanish businesspeople